David Norris Phelps (born October 21, 1969) is an American Christian music vocalist, songwriter and vocal arranger, who is best known for singing tenor in the Gaither Vocal Band. He has also released several solo albums, including four Christmas collections. On January 13, 2008, Phelps appeared on Extreme Makeover Home Edition for the Woodhouse family.

Biography
David Phelps was born in Texas, to Gene and Mary Ella Phelps. Gene is a former accountant/banker who currently teaches business and finance at a college in Houston. Mary Ella is a retired English Professor. He has two older sisters, Sherri Proctor (who sang backup vocals for him on tour, before dying from cancer in September 2012) and Kari Lee (a professional trumpeter who tours with the Chicago-based Millar Brass Ensemble).

Phelps grew up in Tomball, Texas and graduated from Tomball High School in 1988. He attended Baylor University, (where he directed the Baylor Religious Hour Choir) graduating in 1992 with a degree in music and vocal performance.

Phelps was part of the Gaither Vocal Band from 1997 to 2005 and again from 2009 to 2017. He shared the tenor part with Wes Hampton from 2009 to 2017. In early 2017, he left the group to focus on his solo career. He was replaced by Reggie Smith. Phelps has won twelve Dove Awards (with the Gaither Vocal Band), is a four-time Grammy Award nominee and has had several platinum-selling projects. His recent Classic has aired on PBS. In 2019, Phelps' song "Catching Santa" from his 2018 album It Must Be Christmas was featured in an advertisement for Google's Pixel smartphone.

Personal life
David's wife is Lori Purtle Phelps (also born on October 21, 1969). They have four children: Callie, Maggie Beth, David Grant and Coby. Callie, Maggie and Grant can be seen on the Gaither Homecoming videos Christmas in the Country and A Time for Joy. The whole family is featured on the video, The Best of David Phelps from the Homecoming Series. All four children sing on the Classic video, as well.

Discography

Solo albums

Singles
2006: "The Power of the Dream"
2007: "There Is a Fountain"
2016: "Water" (live)
2017: "Santa Claus, Get Well Soon" (studio)
2020: "Last Night on Earth"

Compilations

2009: The Best of David Phelps (Word)
2010: Top 10 (Word)
2015: David Phelps: The Ultimate Collection

With the Gaither Vocal Band
1998: Still the Greatest Story Ever Told
1999: God Is Good
2001: I Do Believe
2002: Everything Good
2003: A Capella
2004: Best of the Gaither Vocal Band
2009: Reunion Vol. 1 & 2 (live)
2009: Reunited
2010: Better Day (live)
2010: Greatly Blessed
2011: I Am a Promise
2012: Pure and Simple
2014: Hymns
2014: The New Edition
2014: Sometimes It Takes a Mountain
2015: Happy Rhythm
2015: Christmas Collection
2016: Better Together
2019: Reunion live
2020: Reunited live

Appearances on other albums
1998: In My Life Larry Gatlin (Spring House) (background)
1999: Within Old Pages Walt Mills (Homeland Records) (background)
2000: Lordsong Lordsong (Daywind); "Trial of the Heart" (background)
2000: Homecoming Praise – Volume 2; "Rock of Ages, Cleft For Me", "Yes, I Know!" (solo)
2001: Lauren Talley Lauren Talley (Horizon); "The Prayer" (duet)
2001: Mark Lowry On Broadway (Spring Hill); "A Whole New World" (duet with Sandi Patty)
2001: Pursuing His Presence The God Chasers (Spring Hill); "Completely Yours" (solo)
2002: Homecoming Lullabies Gaither Gospel Series; "I Spy" (solo)
2006: The Nativity Story: Sacred Songs Various (Watertower Music); "The Virgin's Lullaby" (Background)
2007: Something Beautiful (Disc 2) Gaither Gospel Series; "Dream On" (solo) and "I Walked Today Where Jesus Walks" (Solo)
2008: Wait – 10th Anniversary Edition Lana Ranahan; "Then Came The Morning" (duet) and "I've Just Seen Jesus" (duet)
2009: Let Go Sheila Walsh (Spring Hill), "The Prayer" (duet)
2009: In All I Do Paid in Full; "Because I Love Him" (solo)
2010: Love Will Find a Way Steve Green; "God Is Love" (background)
2012: Hands of Time Anthony Burger; "What A Savior Medley" (background)
2012: Windows in the World Charlotte Ritchie; "After The Last Tear Falls" (background)
2013: Some People Change Michael English; "I Wouldn't Take Nothing for My Journey" (background)
2014: A Beautiful Life Charlotte Ritchie; "Revelation Song" and "Go Rest High on That Mountain" (background)
2014: Out on a Limb Wes Hampton; "Echo of You" (trio/solo), "My Father's House" (background)
2016: Let The Glory Come Down Prestonwood Celebration Choir; "Child, You're Forgiven" (solo)
2016: 1915: Christmas With Fanny Crosby The Public Square; "Hallelujah Christ Is Here" (solo)
2017: The Corner of Broadway & Main Street Voctave; "Being Alive" (solo)
2017: Praises from a Grateful Heart Charlotte Ritchie; "Your Great Name" (background)
2017: Quanah Larry Gatlin (featured soloist)
2018: The Hero - A West End & Friends Tribute West End & Friends; "The Hero" (solo)
2019: Your Time Will Come Ensemble Animato (featured soloist)
2019: Shine Melissa Brady; "Just Beyond The River Jordan" (duet)
2021: The Church Triumphant Artists for the Church; "The Church Triumphant" (solo)
2021: I Believe Carly Paoli; "Carly Paoli & Friends" (duet)

YouTube Exclusives
2020: All I Ask Of You
2022: The Star-Spangled Banner (studio version)

Video

Solo
2006: Legacy of Love [LIVE]
2007: No More Night: David Phelps Live in Birmingham
2007: O Holy Night
2010: Christmas With David Phelps
2012: Classic (Gaither Gospel Series)
2015: Freedom (Gaither Gospel Series)
2018: It Must be Christmas (Gaither Gospel Series)
2019: Hymnal (Gaither Gospel Series)
2021: Stories & Songs Vol. I

With the Gaither Vocal Band
1998: Hawaiian Homecoming
2002: I Do Believe
2003: Australian Homecoming
2009: Reunion Volumes 1 & 2 
2010: Reunited
2010: Better Day
2012: Pure and Simple Volumes 1 & 2
2015: Sometimes It Takes a Mountain
2015: Happy Rhythm
2019: Reunion live
2020: Reunited live

Gaither Homecoming Video featured performances
1998: Kennedy Center Homecoming; "The Battle Hymn of the Republic"
1998: All Day Singin' at the Dome; "I'll Fly Away"
1998: Atlanta Homecoming; "What a Meeting in the Air", "Jesus Saves" 
1998: Journey to the Sky; "O Love That Will Not Let Me Go"
1998: Passin' the Faith Along; "I Can't Even Walk"
1999: Sweet Sweet Spirit; "The Love of God"
1999: So Glad; "The Lifeboat"
2000: Christmas in the Country; "O Holy Night", "The Christmas Song", "Jingle Bells" 
2000: Good News; "I'm Free", "What A Meeting in the Air"
2000: Irish Homecoming; "This Could Be the Dawning of that Day"
2000: Whispering Hope; "The Lifeboat", "When God Dips His Love in My Heart"
2000: Harmony in the Heartland; "A House of Gold", "Oh, What a Time"
2000: Memphis Homecoming; "Searchin'", "Build an Ark", "God is Good All the Time"
2001: A Billy Graham Music Homecoming – Volume 2; "The Love of God", "It is Well with My Soul"
2001: Mark Lowry On Broadway; "A Whole New World" (duet with Sandi Patty)
2002: Freedom Band; "Worthy the Lamb"
2002: I'll Fly Away; "I'll Fly Away", "When I Survey the Wondrous Cross"
2002: God Bless America; "End of the Beginning", "The Battle Hymn of the Republic"
2003: Heaven; "No More Night", "What a Day That Will Be"
2003: Rocky Mountain Homecoming; "These are They" 
2003: Australian Homecoming; "Let the Glory Come Down"
2004: We Will Stand; "When I Survey the Wondrous Cross", "Sweeter As the Days Go By" 
2005: Jerusalem; "It Is Well with My Soul", "These are They", "Second Fiddle" 
2007: How Great Thou Art; "There Is a Fountain Filled with Blood"
2008: Rock of Ages; "When I Survey the Wondrous Cross"
2010: Giving Thanks; "You Are My All in All", "I Will Sing of My Redeemer"
2011: The Best of David Phelps from the Homecoming Series
2011: Alaskan Homecoming; "America, the Beautiful", "Clean", "These are They"
2011: Majesty; "His Eye Is on the Sparrow"
2011: Tent Revival Homecoming; "I Stand Amazed," "He's Alive"
2017: Sweeter As The Days Go By: "We'll Talk It Over"

References

External links

Official website
"When God Dips His Love" video

1969 births
Living people
American gospel singers
American male songwriters
Singers from Texas
American tenors
Songwriters from Texas
Southern gospel performers
People from Tomball, Texas